Class A, published as The Dealer in the United States, and as The Mission for 5000 prints, is the second book in the Robert Muchamore's novel series CHERUB. It continues the story of teenager James Adams and his fellow CHERUB agents as they try to bring down a drug gang led by Keith Moore. The book was originally to be called Drugs, Cars and Guns, but this was changed so as to sound more appropriate for children. It received generally good reviews although not as many awards as its predecessor, The Recruit. It is followed by Maximum Security.

It was released in the United Kingdom by Hodder Children's Books on 14 October 2004, and as The Dealer by Simon Pulse in the United States on 23 August 2011.

Plot
CHERUB agents Kerry, Nicole, Kyle, and James are sent on a mission to infiltrate the drug gang KMG, led by criminal Keith Moore. The group attempts to befriend Moore's four children to attempt to gather evidence against KMG. James has the most success, becoming friends with Keith's youngest son Junior and begins delivering cocaine to KMG's customers. Meanwhile, Nicole begins dating Junior and they take a large amount of cocaine, nearly killing Nicole and resulting in her expulsion from CHERUB.

Kerry discovers KMG's cocaine processing location, and MI5 set up surveillance on it, resulting in the capture and imprisonment of many of KMG's senior members, but not Keith Moore. Moore invites James and Junior to come with him to Miami, intending to settle all his accounts and have some final time with Junior before escaping from the UK to avoid imprisonment. Before James leaves, he finds out that Lauren hit instructor Norman Large with a shovel while doing Basic Training. She is forced to wait 2 months until she can restart basic training. James goes on the trip with Junior and Keith, but KMG's drug supplier, the Peruvian Lambayeke cartel, attempts to rob Moore. James kills a man and escapes, but Junior becomes badly injured, while Moore is captured and imprisoned by the police. KMG is destroyed, so the agents return to campus. After the end of the mission, James and Kerry begin dating.

Characters 

 James Adams: The protagonist; a twelve-year-old boy who travels to Luton, near London, to investigate KMG, a drug cartel. He becomes friends with Keith Moore, Jr.
 Kyle Blueman: A fifteen-year-old and James' best friend. He accompanies him on the mission and gets punished for smoking cannabis at a house party.
 Nicole Eddison: A twelve-year-old agent, she gets expelled for snorting cocaine with Junior Moore.

Development 
The book was originally to be titled Class A 'Drugs, Cars & Guns, but Hodder deemed it too inappropriate for a children's book, so Muchamore changed the title to Class A.

When the book was published in America, publisher Simon Pulse renamed it The Dealer, due to concern that Americans wouldn't understand the title's reference to the British system of classing drugs.

As a further order from a major book club, 5,000 copies were printed with the name The Mission as they didn't like the original title.

A graphic novel adaption of the novel was published on 1 June 2017.

Audiobook 
An audiobook version of Class A was released, read by Julian Rhind-Tutt. It consisted of three CDs.

References

External links 
 Official CHERUB site
 UK page of CHERUB website for book
 USA page of CHERUB website for book
 Author's official site

CHERUB novels
2004 British novels
Hodder & Stoughton books